Dobanovci is a suburban neighborhood of Belgrade, Serbia. It is located in Belgrade's municipality of Surčin.

Dobanovci is located in the eastern Syrmia region, 25 km west of downtown Belgrade, between the Belgrade-Zagreb highway and the channeled stream of Galovica. It is the northernmost settlement in the municipality, 6 km northeast of the municipal seat of Surčin, close to the border of the Zemun municipality.

History
Baden culture graves and ceramics (bowls, anthropomorphic urns) were found in the town.

First official mention of the town was in 1404 when its name appeared in the tax paying lists. Officially was proclaimed a settlement in the 18th century. Apparently the name comes from the title 'ban', just as the relatively close settlements of Novi Banovci (new ban's place) and Stari Banovci (old ban's place) both in the province of Vojvodina, in which case Dobanovci would mean '(the town) next to the ban's place'.

Until the early 1960s Dobanovci had its own municipality which was then annexed to the municipality of Surčin.

Demographics
Despite its typical rural appearance, Dobanovci is officially classified as an urban settlement (town). It is the second largest settlement in the Surčin municipality, after the municipal seat and has a constant population growth. Dobanovci stretches southeast to Surčin and to the north in the direction of the settlements of Grmovac and Ugrinovci, forming one almost continuing ring-shaped built-up urban area in eastern Syrmia (Dobanovci-Surčin-Bežanija-Bežanijska Kosa-Plavi Horizonti-Altina-Zemun Polje-Busije-Ugrinovci-Grmovac). Population of Dobanovci according to the official censa:

 1921 – 3,036
 1931 – 3,298
 1953 – 3,519
 1971 – 6,741
 1981 – 7,592
 1991 – 7,691
 2002 – 8,128

The only two significant ethnic groups (by census 2002) are Serbs (7,524 or 92,57%) and Slovaks (232 or 2,85%).

Economy
As many formerly rural suburbs of Belgrade, Dobanovci has developed a typical suburban agriculture, mostly greenhouse cultivated vegetables. Several branches of industry developed in the past few decades, like footwear, food, brickworks  and the repair facilities for tractors and agricultural machines.

Dobanovci is a major traffic junction. It is located on the Belgrade-Zagreb highway (E70), on the point where the future, still uncompleted Belgrade beltway separated from the highway. Also, Dobanovci has a train station the Belgrade's internal freight railway Batajnica–Surčin–Ostružnica–Železnik–Resnik which generally follows the route of the beltway. Several local roads also connects it to Surčin and Grmovac-Ugrinovci.

Singidunum 
In November 2019 it was announced that a completely new settlement will be built near Dobanovci Interchange on the beltway. The complex will cover . Named Singidunum, the settlement is planned as the typical satellite city which should include industrial park, residential zone, commercial-business center, medical center, green areas, etc. Economic facilities are planned for 9,700 workers. Residential area is projected to have apartments for 30% of the workers, which is 3,000 units, or 9,000 inhabitants, more than Dobanovci itself.

References

Sources
 Mala Prosvetina Enciklopedija, Third edition (1985); Prosveta; 
 Jovan Đ. Marković (1990): Enciklopedijski geografski leksikon Jugoslavije; Svjetlost-Sarajevo;

External links
 official Internet presentation of Dobanovci

Populated places in Syrmia
Suburbs of Belgrade
Former and proposed municipalities of Belgrade
Surčin